Brookmeyer (also released as Bob Brookmeyer and his Orchestra) is an album by jazz trombonist and arranger Bob Brookmeyer recorded in 1956 for the RCA Records subsidiary Vik label.

Reception

The Allmusic review by Ken Dryden stated "Brookmeyer shines whenever he takes an opportunity to solo, as do his fellow musicians."

Track listing
All compositions by Bob Brookmeyer, except where noted.
 "Oh Jane Snavely – 3:09 
 "Nature Boy –  (eden ahbez) – 7:06 
 "Just You and Me" (Jesse Greer, Raymond Klages) – 2:41 
 "I'm Old Fashioned"   (Jerome Kern, Johnny Mercer) – 2:55
 "Gone Latin" – 3:07
 "Zing Went the Strings of My Heart" (James F. Hanley) – 6:12 
 "Big City Life"  – 4:11 
 "Confusion Blues" – 4:17 
 "Open Country" – 6:12

Personnel 
Bob Brookmeyer – valve trombone
Al DeRisi (tracks 1, 3 & 9), Joe Ferrante (tracks 1, 3 & 9), Bernie Glow (tracks 1–4, 6 & 9), Louis Oles (tracks 1, 3 & 9), Nick Travis (tracks 2 & 4-8)- trumpet
Joe Singer –  French horn (tracks 1, 3 & 9)
Al Epstein – bassoon, English horn (tracks 5, 6 & 8)
Don Butterfield – tuba (tracks 2, 6 & 8)
Gene Quill – alto saxophone (tracks 5, 6 & 8)
Al Cohn – tenor saxophone, clarinet 
Ed Wasserman – tenor saxophone (tracks 1, 3 & 9)
Al Epstein (tracks 1-4 & 9), Sol Schlinger (tracks 1, 3, 5, 6, 8 & 9) – baritone saxophone
Hank Jones – piano (tracks 1, 3, 5, 6, 8 & 9)
Milt Hinton (tracks 2, 4 & 5-8), Buddy Jones (tracks 1, 3 & 9) – bass
Osie Johnson – drums

References 

1957 albums
RCA Records albums
Bob Brookmeyer albums